Charles of Sicily may refer to the following kings:

Charles I of Sicily
Charles II of Sicily, also king of Spain and Naples and Holy Roman emperor
Charles III of Sicily, also king of Spain and Naples
Charles IV of Sicily, also king of Naples and Holy Roman emperor
Charles V of Sicily, also king of Spain and Naples